In molecular biology, Small nucleolar RNA Z151 (homologous to R11) is a non-coding RNA (ncRNA) molecule which functions in the modification of other small nuclear RNAs (snRNAs). This type of modifying RNA is usually located in the nucleolus of the eukaryotic cell which is a major site of snRNA biogenesis. It is known as a small nucleolar RNA (snoRNA) and also often referred to as a guide RNA.
snoRNA Z151 belongs to the C/D box class of snoRNAs which contain the conserved sequence motifs known as the C box (UGAUGA) and the D box (CUGA). Most of the members of the box C/D family function in directing site-specific 2'-O-methylation of substrate RNAs
Plant snoRNA Z151 was identified in screens of Oryza sativa
 and Arabidopsis thaliana.

References

External links
 

Small nuclear RNA